Boomtown Records was an independent record label founded by Jaddan Comerford in October 2002 and based in Melbourne, Australia. In 2011 the label was rebranded with Staple Management to new company, UNFD.

History 
The label was established by Jaddan Comerford when he was 18, after being inspired by thriving independent labels like Epitaph Records. After operating the label out of his basement, Comerford moved into an office building in 2005. In March 2006 Comerford established the Staple Group with two arms; that being Artist Management (Behind Crimson Eyes, The Getaway Plan, Horsell Common and Antiskeptic) and Marketing, which focuses on direct, street level and viral internet marketing (with clients including Warner Music Australia and Hurley Clothing).

Boomtown had its first ever 'Boomtown Showdown Tour' in May 2005, showcasing the label's talent (Behind Crimson Eyes, Wishful Thinking, Angelas Dish and Sounds Like Chicken), which sold out to 800 people in Melbourne. In 2006 the 'Boomtown Showdown Tour' went national with eight shows on the east coast of Australia. The performance in Melbourne, featuring Horsell Common, The Getaway Plan, Angelas Dish, Wishful Thinking and In Fiction, was recorded and released on DVD. The 'Boomtown Showdown Tour' continued in 2007, featuring The Getaway Plan, In Fiction, The Amity Affliction and Elora Danan with thirteen dates across the east and west coasts of Australia, and included the first ever Boomtown Showdown shows in Western Australia.

Boomtown bands
Behind Crimson Eyes

Behind Crimson Eyes (Melbourne) - Boomtown signed the band in late 2004, releasing the band's debut EP, Pavour Nocturnus in 2005. It entered the Australian Independent Record (AIR) charts at number two. The band's follow up, Prologue: The Art of War/Cherry Blossom Epitaph was also released by Boomtown in 2005, spending eight weeks in the Australian charts and peaking at #81. In August 2006 the band went on to sign with US heavy metal label, Roadrunner Records.

The Getaway Plan

The Getaway Plan (Melbourne) - Boomtown released the band's debut album Other Voices, Other Rooms in February 2008. The album debuted at number 14 on the ARIA charts, number three on the Australian ARIA charts and number one on the AIR charts, where it stayed for over a year. The second single from the album, "Where the City Meets the Sea", peaked at number 28 on the ARIA singles charts. The Getaway Plan were nominated for 'Best Australian Independent Artist' at the 2008 Jägermeister AIR Awards. In February 2009 The Getaway Plan formally announced that it would be disbanding following final performances in March, although they have since reformed and released a new album.

Elora Danan

Elora Danan (Perth) - Boomtown released the band's debut Mini-Album We All Have Secrets in 2007 and they toured as part of the Boomtown Showdown in 2007. The band's debut album entitled In the Room Up There was released on 6 March 2009 on Boomtown Records. The label has released two singles from the album "Door, Up, Elevator" and "The Greater Good".

In Fiction

In Fiction (Adelaide) - Boomtown released both the band's EPs, The Four Letter Failure - which reached number 72 on the ARIA singles chart and Ghost which reached number 11. The band's debut album, The Forecast, was released in June 2008.

Horsell Common

Horsell Common (Melbourne) - Boomtown released their debut album The Rescue in September 2007, with the album reaching number six on the AIR album charts. The first single from the album, "Satellite Wonderland", reaching number one on the AIR singles chart.

Mere Theory

Mere Theory (Adelaide) - In June 2007 Boomtown signed Mere Theory and released their debut album 'Catalan Atlas' in September 2007.

Boomtown Records also have exclusive deals for the Australian releases of American artists Blackpool Lights, Lifetime, Copeland and Jonah Matranga.

List of artists

Current We Are Unified roster
The Amity Affliction
The Bride
Dream On, Dreamer
Buried in Verona
Deez Nuts
The Getaway Plan
House Vs. Hurricane
Miami Horror
Northlane
The Summer Set
We Are Augustines
We Came As Romans
Former:
Angelas Dish
Behind Crimson Eyes
Elora Danan
Sounds Like Chicken
Horsell Common
In Fiction
Mere Theory
Philadelphia Grand Jury (Boomtown Deal through Normal People Making Hits)
Wishful Thinking
Wherewolves (formerly A Year To Remember)
One-Off International Releases
Copeland
Blackpool Lights
The Dear Hunter
Jonah Matranga
Envy on the Coast
The Receiving End of Sirens

Boomtown releases

References

External links
Boomtownshowdown at MySpace
Discography at Discogs
Discography at MusicBrainz

Australian independent record labels
Record labels established in 2002
Alternative rock record labels
2002 establishments in Australia
Record labels based in Melbourne